Svend O. Heiberg Memorial Forest is a  research forest located in parts of Onondaga and Cortland counties, and within the towns of Truxton, Preble, Fabius, and Tully in New York State. The forest is named after Svend O. Heiberg, former Associate Dean of Graduate Studies at the New York State College of Forestry at Syracuse University (now SUNY-ESF), in Syracuse, New York.

History and facilities
Heiberg Memorial Forest was established in 1948 with  obtained from the New York State Department of Environmental Conservation in exchange for SUNY-ESF's Salamanca Forest in Cattaraugus County. The forest today consists of  utilized as a research forest as part of SUNY-ESF's regional campus and includes classrooms, research buildings and other facilities.

Public access
The forest is accessible to the public. Over  of trails provide recreation opportunities, including the Heiberg Memorial Forest Trail, a  loop that permits hiking and cross-country skiing.

Two small ponds are available for fishing within Heiberg Memorial Forest.  Padget Pond and  Sargent Pond are both stocked annually in the fall, with Padget Pond receiving 2,000 fingerling rainbow trout and Sargent Pond receiving 700 fingerling brook trout. Both ponds are accessible via an approximately  trail from a parking area on Maple Ridge Road.

Cut-your-own Christmas trees, including Douglas fir and balsam fir, are sold at the forest each year.

References

External links

 

State University of New York College of Environmental Science and Forestry
Forests of New York (state)
Protected areas of Onondaga County, New York
Protected areas of Cortland County, New York
Education in Cortland County, New York